The Roman Catholic Diocese of Benjamín Aceval is a diocese located in the city of Benjamín Aceval in the Ecclesiastical province of Asunción in Paraguay.

History
 On June 28, 1980 the Diocese of Benjamín Aceval was established from the Diocese of Concepción and Apostolic Vicariate of Pilcomayo

Leadership, in reverse chronological order
 Bishops of Benjamín Aceval (Roman rite)
 Bishop Amancio Francisco Benítez Candia (June 16, 2018 – present)
 Bishop Cándido Cárdenas Villalba (July 6, 1998 – June 16, 2018)
 Bishop Mario Melanio Medina Salinas (June 28, 1980 – July 6, 1998), appointed Coadjutor Bishop of San Juan Bautista de las Misiones

References
 GCatholic.org
 Catholic Hierarchy

Roman Catholic dioceses in Paraguay
Christian organizations established in 1980
Roman Catholic dioceses and prelatures established in the 20th century
Benjamín Aceval, Roman Catholic Diocese of
Presidente Hayes Department